Inger "Jane Brick" Lindström (12 June 1942 – 3 September 2016) was a Swedish television journalist.

Jane Brick worked for Swedish Television where she was a news anchor for the report, as well as a foreign correspondent. She was married twice with cartoonist Ove Lindström (born 1940), the first time from 1971 to 1982 and the second time in 1992 to his death. She had a son, Stefan.

She died of a brain tumor in Stockholm on 3 September 2016.

References

1942 births
2016 deaths
Deaths from brain cancer in Sweden
Journalists from Stockholm
Swedish women journalists
20th-century Swedish journalists
21st-century Swedish journalists